Friendship Park is a  park in the city of Cerritos, California.

References

Cerritos, California